62 (sixty-two) is the natural number following 61 and preceding 63.

In mathematics 
62 is:

The 43rd composite number with the divisors 2 and 31, being the eighteenth discrete semiprime.
a nontotient.
palindromic and a repdigit in bases 5 (2225) and 30 (2230) 
the sum of the number of faces, edges and vertices of icosahedron or dodecahedron.
the number of faces of two of the Archimedean solids, the rhombicosidodecahedron and truncated icosidodecahedron.
the smallest number that is the sum of three distinct positive squares in two ways,  
the only number whose cube in base 10 (238328) consists of 3 digits each occurring 2 times.
the tenth member of the 7-aliquot tree (7, 8, 10, 14, 20, 22, 34, 38, 49, 62, 75, 118, 148, etc). It has an aliquot sum of 34; itself a discrete semiprime, and its aliquot sequence is: 62,34,20,22,14,10,8,7,1,0.
The 20th & 21st, 72nd & 73rd, 75th & 76th digits of pi.

In science 

Sixty-two is the atomic number of samarium, a lanthanide.

In other fields 
62 is the code for international direct dial calls to Indonesia.
In the 1998 Home Run Race, Mark McGwire hit his 62nd home run on September 8, breaking the single-season record. Sammy Sosa hit his 62nd home run just days later on September 13.
Under Social Security (United States), the earliest age at which a person may begin receiving retirement benefits (other than disability).

References 

Integers